The Magician is a 2005 Australian film written and directed by Scott Ryan. Ryan edited a half-hour version of the film for screening at the St. Kilda Film Festival, where it was seen by stuntman and film producer Nash Edgerton (brother of Joel Edgerton), who took the project under his wing. After receiving A$330,000 in government grants, the film was re-released in 2005.

Plot
A mockumentary that follows the escapades of Ray Shoesmith, a Melbourne underworld hitman who hires a film student to document his life.

Cast
 Scott Ryan as Ray Shoesmith
 Ben Walker as Tony Richards
 Massimiliano Andrighetto as Massimo "Max" Totti
 Kane Mason as Benny
 Nathaniel Lindsay as Edna

Box office
The Magician grossed $182,164 at the box office in Australia.

Reception
The film holds a 75% approval rating from critics based on 16 reviews at Rotten Tomatoes.

Awards and nominations 

 Film Critics Circle of Australia Awards

 IF Awards

 Melbourne Underground Film Festival

Spinoff series
A television spinoff based on the Ray Shoesmith character premiered on FX in 2018 titled Mr Inbetween. Ryan reprised his role, and served as writer and producer on the show. Nash Edgerton also served as producer and directed every episode. The show ran for 3 seasons and drew critical acclaim.

See also
Cinema of Australia
Mr Inbetween

References

External links
 
 The Magician at the National Film and Sound Archive

2005 films
Australian crime drama films
2000s crime drama films
Films shot in Melbourne
Films about contract killing
2005 drama films
2000s English-language films
2000s Australian films